David Cuperman (born 8 November 1996) is a Colombian professional footballer currently contracted with F.C. Ashdod.

Biography
Cuperman was born to parents Salomon Cuperman and Raquel Coifman in Bogota. After attending Colegio Colombo Hebreo for high school, Cuperman left for the US to study sports management and coaching at Averett University. He earned USA South All-Conference First Team honors. Cuperman was named to the 2017 Jewish Sports Review Men's Soccer All-America First Team for Division II and II.

In 2017, Cuperman traveled to Israel to represent Colombia at the 2017 Maccabiah Games.

On 10 August 2022 became an Israeli citizen.

Football career
Cuperman made his debut in the Colombian Categoría Primera A with Alianza Petrolera on 16 February 2021, starting at left midfield against Patriotas Boyacá.

In 2022, Cuperman joined FC Ashdod in Israel on trial.

See also
List of select Jewish football (association; soccer) players

References

External links
 

1996 births
Living people
Colombian Jews
Jewish footballers
Colombian footballers
Footballers from Bogotá
Fortaleza C.E.I.F. footballers
Alianza Petrolera F.C. players
F.C. Ashdod players
Categoría Primera A players
Categoría Primera B players
Israeli Premier League players
Association football defenders
Naturalized citizens of Israel
Colombian emigrants to Israel
Maccabiah Games competitors
Maccabiah Games footballers
Competitors at the 2017 Maccabiah Games